Abū Murra Sayf bin Dhī Yazan al-Ḥimyarī was a semi-legendary Himyarite king of Yemen who lived between 516 and 578 CE, known for ending  Axumite rule over Southern Arabia with the help of the Sassanid Empire.

To reconquer Yemen, Sayf asked Khosrau I king of the Sasanian Empire to help him fight the Aksumites. According to Al-Masudi Sayf dialogued with the Sassanid king about racial tensions between white and black:

 Khosrau agreed and sent 800 men with Wahriz as their leader. Masruq ibn Abraha, king of Yemen, confronted the army but lost in the battle. The Sasanians advanced to conquer San'a, however, Sayf was instated as King on the understanding that he would send taxes to Khosrau. He was later stabbed to death by Ethiopian servants, and the Sassanians reconquered Yemen and Vahriz was instated as Governor of Yemen, alongside Sayf's son.

Popular culture
Prophet Muhammad's grandfather, Abd al-Muttalib met Sayf in his palace in Ghamadan.
Sayf entered Arab folklore by means of his widely known "biography" Sīrat Sayf ibn Dhī-Yazan that accounts his conquests of the human and mythical jinn realm, blending historical facts with Arab folklore and mythology. Yazan has become a popular boy name in contemporary Arab culture.

References

Sources 
  
 
 
 

Kings of Himyar
6th-century Arabs
6th-century monarchs in the Middle East
Pre-Islamic Arabia
Abyssinian–Persian wars
One Thousand and One Nights characters